Al-Garrya (Arabic: القرية) is a village on the island of Sitra, Bahrain.

Sitra's housing area is located in Al-Garrya. It is not to be confused with the eponymous village near Budaiya Highway.

Sitra
Populated places in the Capital Governorate, Bahrain